In the economics of demography, the term spending wave refers to the economic effect of departure of children from the home. When a society experiences a high level of such family change then an economic decline follows from reduced spending overall.

Example
For example, in U.S. contemporary economics,  Harry Dent, a University of South Carolina and Harvard Business School graduate and Fortune 100 consultant, has popularized the baby-boomer spending wave theory. According to Dent, the stock-market decline of 2008 was a result of baby boomers aging past their peak spending years. This prediction was based on the observation that consumer spending peaks near age 50. In 2002 Dan Arnold echoed this theory in his book The Great Bust Ahead, with the big spenders being 45- to 54-year-olds, and their numbers peaking in 2011–2012.

Other authors, such as Schieber and Shoven, suggest that the gradual peaking of the social security trust fund in the United States will occur around the 2007–2009 time period.

Some experts expect the worst consumer recession, since 1980, to occur when aging boomers start retiring, adding to rising unemployment, decline in house values, and declining stock prices. However other experts have suggested that immigration to the US and the rise of emerging economies will offset the baby boomer demographic impact.  Still other experts have postulated that, due to the 2008 major stock market decline and home equity crash, many baby boomers will have lost so much equity that they will retire at a later age than was previously planned.

See also
Kondratiev wave
Recession

References

Recessions
Market trends
Business cycle
Ageing
Demographic economics